The Old York Hospital is a two-storey building constructed in 1896, to provide improved hospital facilities for the township of York, Western Australia and the surrounding district. Other buildings on the site include the former morgue, the former laundry (1942), the former nurses' quarters (1925), and the former maternity block (1941).

History

The hospital building replaced an earlier hospital which had been part of the York Convict Hiring Depot (1852), which was a hospital for men only. 

The hospital was built by Christie and Company for a cost of £2,267/19/6.

The first matron was Mary Ann Nicholas, the last matron of the Perth Colonial Hospital. Her staff consisted of a nurse, cook, orderly and wardsmaid. In the first year, 65 patients were admitted. When necessary, surgery was carried out on the kitchen table.

There was an urgent need at the time for hospitals in the Avon Valley:

The roof, originally shingled with hand-split she-oak shingles, was re-shingled in 1935.

When the hospital closed in 1963, it was used as the Civil Defence Headquarters and then sold to the United Department of Christian Education (Methodist Church) which called the building Mirrambeena House. It was then sold to the National Trust in April 1976, and the building was restored under the guidance of architect John Pidgeon, and leased to the Youth Community Recreation and National Fitness Council and was used as a youth hostel. The Youth Hostels Association ceased to use the building in 1995 and it is now a private residence.

Arts and Crafts design

The hospital is a fine example of Federation Arts and Crafts design in Western Australia, being designed by Principal Architect George Temple-Poole.  The building "gives the impression rather of a Victorian gentleman's mansion than a government institution".

The hospital building has some features of Red House, Bexleyheath in the south of London, the home designed by William Morris, one of the founders of the Arts and Crafts movement; for example the fact that the roof over the main entrance porch “comes down low and asymmetrically as part of the main roof”.
Other Arts and Crafts features include:
Prominent eaves with exposed brackets
Local materials (brick)
Steeply pitched roof
Tall chimneys
Gables
Archway on the left
Informal window arrangement

See also
 Residency Museum, York

References

Buildings and structures in York, Western Australia
Hospitals established in 1896
1896 establishments in Australia
Former hospitals in Western Australia
Western Australian places listed on the defunct Register of the National Estate
Heritage places in York, Western Australia
State Register of Heritage Places in the Shire of York